Sahastata sinuspersica is a species of the araneomorph spider family Filistatidae (crevice weavers).

Distribution 
This species is endemic to Hormozgan Province, Iran.

Description 
The female holotype measured 12.0 mm and a male was measured 4.85 mm.

Etymology 
This species was named after the Persian Gulf.

References 

Filistatidae
Endemic fauna of Iran
Spiders of Asia
Spiders described in 2014